Louis François Marie Le Tellier Marquis of Barbezieux (23 June 1668 – 5 January 1701) was a French statesman.

Biography
Born in Barbezieux-Saint-Hilaire (Charente), he was the third son of the Marquis de Louvois, War Minister to Louis XIV.

After the death of Louvois, Louis XIV appointed Barbezieux to succeed his father and grandfather, becoming the third Le Tellier to serve Louis XIV at the War Ministry. Although talented, the 23-year-old neglected his office in favour of his pleasures. The King complained to Barbezieux's uncle, Charles-Maurice Le Tellier, Archbishop of Reims that:Your nephew has talents, but he does not make good use of them. He prefers to dine with princes rather than work. He neglected his affairs for his pleasures. He leaves officers waiting too long in his antechamber; he speaks to them disdainfully and sometimes harshly.

Marriage and Children 
Barbezieux was twice married: 
firstly in 1691 to Louise de Crussol (died 1694), daughter of Emmanuel II de Crussol, Duc d'Uzès, with whom he had one daughter : 
Anne-Catherine-Eléonore (died 1716). 
 secondly in 1696 to Marie-Thérèse d'Alègre (died 1706), daughter of Yves d'Alègre, with whom he had two daughters : 
 Marie-Madeleine,  married François, Duke of Harcourt (1689-1750), they are the ancestors of Duke of Richelieu and Elizabeth, Empress of Austria. 
 Louise Françoise Angélique Le Tellier (died 1718). Made a splendid marriage with Emmanuel Théodose de La Tour d'Auvergne,  son of the Duke of Bouillon and Marie Anne Mancini. She died giving birth to a son, Godefroy Girault de La Tour d'Auvergne, Duke of Château-Thierry.

Further reading
 Corvisier, André, Louvois. Fayard, Paris, 1983.
 Tellier, Luc-Normand, Face aux Colbert: les Le Tellier, Vauban, Turgot et l'avènement du libéralisme, PUQ, Quebec City, 1987.

1668 births
1701 deaths
People from Charente
French untitled nobility
Louis
17th-century French politicians